Isabelle Coutant-Peyre (born in 1952) is a French lawyer engaged to Ilich Ramírez Sánchez, the international terrorist better known as "Carlos" or "Carlos the Jackal".

She represented Zacarias Moussaoui early on during his imprisonment, while he was awaiting trial for his role in the terrorist attacks of 11 September 2001.

She was married to a civil servant and has three sons, Florent, Gabriel and Aurelien.

She became a lawyer and worked with Jacques Vergès, defender of Djamila Bouhired and she supports her defence of "revolutionary fighters" with income from her activities as a business lawyer.

In her political cases, she employs "rupture" techniques.
She was briefly jailed for likening French police to the Gestapo.

Her fiancé Carlos is currently held in Clairvaux Prison, where he is part of the general inmate population, and their attempts to marry have been frustrated by legal issues. Conjugal visits can only be made after a civil marriage occurs; a Muslim ceremony performed in 2001 (when Carlos was married to his second wife and Isabelle was married to her first husband) has no legal force. She believes Carlos is innocent of all his alleged crimes in Paris.

Her other clients include Stellio Capo Chichi, Youssouf Fofana (murderer of Ilan Halimi), Roger Garaudy, Mohamed Benalel Merah (father of Mohammed Merah responsible for Toulouse and Montauban shootings), Charles Sobhraj, and the Islamic Republic of Iran against the film Argo.

Bibliography 
 "Grand témoin : Isabelle Coutant-Peyre", in Hallier Edernellement vôtre, Jean-Pierre Thiollet, Neva Editions, 2019, p. 173–188.

References

External links
Sunday Telegraph on Isabelle's love for Carlos

1952 births
Living people
Place of birth missing (living people)
20th-century French women lawyers
21st-century French women lawyers
20th-century French lawyers
21st-century French lawyers